Lazaro Mendez, better known by his stage name DJ Laz (born December 2, 1971 in Hollywood, Florida, United States) is a Cuban-American rapper and DJ from Miami, Florida. He hosted his weekday radio show in Miami on WPOW 96.5 FM, branded "Power 96", for 22 years until he left the company in April 2012. Beginning July 4, 2012, the new DJ Laz Morning Show began after arbitration on the newly reformatted WRMA DJ106.7 a Bilingual Dance/Rhythmic formatted station.

He is best known for his limp which came from his battle with polio as a child. Also known for albums DJ Laz and Category 6, which charted on U.S. Billboard album charts. He is also notable for the singles "Journey Into Bass" (1994) and "Move Shake Drop" (2008), which peaked at #56 on the Billboard Hot 100.

The DJ Laz Morning Show on LA 96.3 of Los Angeles and DJ 106.7 of Miami is known for mysteriously getting their hands on exclusive content. DJ Laz is also known for his show's prominent appearance on Fox's television show, Dish Nation.

In July 2012, when Justin Bieber made a 911 call to authorities to report paparazzi that were following him, the DJ Laz Morning Show was the first to obtain Bieber's 911 call, airing it on Los Angeles' LA 96.3.

On Tuesday, September 11, 2012, the DJ Laz Morning Show aired a pre-recorded interview with President Barack Obama. Many Obama critics quickly bashed Obama for making no mention to the September 11 attacks in 2001, despite the fact that the interview was pre-recorded. The White House later made it clear that the call was indeed pre-recorded and was supposed to have been played on Monday, September 10.

On May 5, 2014, DJ Laz was in command of a boat that was stuck on a sand bar in Biscayne Bay. When bystanders got out to push the boat, DJ Laz increased power to the engine, and killed a 23-year-old man who had been trying to help he was killed by the boat prop. He was never given a sobriety test and there was no further investigation. 

DJ Laz hosted the Morning Show for 97.3 in Miami from August, 2014 until November, 2019. He left in advance of an acquisition, and can currently be found on Sirius XM on Pitbull's Globalization Channel 13.

In 2021 DJ Laz joined Miami's new 90's station Totally 93.9 hosting weekday afternoons.

Discography 
Studio albums
{| class="wikitable"
! rowspan="2" |Year
! rowspan="2" |Title
! colspan="3" |Chart positions
|-
!Top R&B/Hip-Hop Albums
!Top Rap Albums
!Heatseekers Albums
|-
|1991
|D.J. Laz
 Released: November 26, 1991
 Label: Pandisc
| style="text-align:center;" |86
| style="text-align:center;" |—
| style="text-align:center;" |—
|-
|1993
|Journey Into Bass
 Released: January 24, 1993
 Label: Pandisc
| style="text-align:center;" |—
| style="text-align:center;" |—
| style="text-align:center;" |—
|-
|1996
|King Of Bass
 Released: July 12, 1996
 Label: Pandisc
| style="text-align:center;" |—
| style="text-align:center;" |—
| style="text-align:center;" |46
|-
|1998
|''Cruzin Released: February 24, 1998
 Label: Pandisc
| style="text-align:center;" |—
| style="text-align:center;" |—
| style="text-align:center;" |—
|-
|2000
|Pimpin
 Released: January 25, 2000
 Label: Pandisc
| style="text-align:center;" |—
| style="text-align:center;" |—
| style="text-align:center;" |—
|-
|2008
|Category 6
 Released: July 29, 2008
 Label: VIP Music/Federal Distribution
| style="text-align:center;" |49
| style="text-align:center;" |23
| style="text-align:center;" |18
|}Instrumental albums1994: Bass XXX
1996: Bass XXX, Vol. II
2001: XXX BreaksCompilation albums2001: Greatest Hits
2004: The Latin Album

Charted singlesOther singles'''
1991: "Mami El Negro"
1992: "Moments in Bass"
1992: "Latin Rhythm"
1992: "Hump All Night"
1995: "Shake It Up"
1996: "Esa Morena"
1998: "Sabrosura"
1998: "Negra Chula"
1999: "Get Your Ass Off Stage"
2000: "The Red Alert Project"
2000: "Ki Ki Ri Bu"
2000: "Facina"
2008: "She Can Get It"
2009: "I Made It to the U.S.A."
2010: "Alcoholic" (featuring Pitbull)
2011: "You Got Me Going" (featuring Vein)

References

External links
 DJ Laz at MySpace
 
 Detailed discography of DJ Laz at Discogs
 [ Profile and discography of DJ Laz] at Allmusic

1971 births
American hip hop DJs
Living people
American freestyle musicians
Rappers from Miami
21st-century American rappers